The  is the prefectural parliament of Fukuoka Prefecture.

Members
As of 31 October 2019
Sources:

References

External links
Official website (Japanese)

Prefectural assemblies of Japan
Politics of Fukuoka Prefecture